Eagle Township is one of the twelve townships of Vinton County, Ohio, United States.  The 2010 census found 704 people in the township.

Geography
Located in the northwestern corner of the county, it borders the following townships:
Salt Creek Township, Hocking County: north
Jackson Township: east
Richland Township: southeast corner
Harrison Township: south
Liberty Township, Ross County: southwest
Harrison Township, Ross County: west

No municipalities are located in Eagle Township.

Name and history
Statewide, other Eagle Townships are located in Brown and Hancock counties.

Government
The township is governed by a three-member board of trustees, who are elected in November of odd-numbered years to a four-year term beginning on the following January 1. Two are elected in the year after the presidential election and one is elected in the year before it. There is also an elected township fiscal officer, who serves a four-year term beginning on April 1 of the year after the election, which is held in November of the year before the presidential election. Vacancies in the fiscal officership or on the board of trustees are filled by the remaining trustees.

References

External links
Vinton County Chamber of Commerce 

Townships in Vinton County, Ohio
Townships in Ohio